Patrick Walsh (fl. 1850s/1860s) was an Irish piper.

Little is known of Walsh, beyond that he was a native of Mayo, large in stature, and lived about the middle of the nineteenth century. He believed he inherited his gifts from the fairies. 

He emigrated to Lancashire, playing every night for good wages. However, one night new customers rudely ordered him to put away his pipes and let their friend, a fiddler, play instead. 

 "Under ordinary circumstances he would be well pleased to get a rest while some other musician continued the entertainment, but the insulting tone in which he had been addressed so stirred his hot Milesian blood that he could not overlook the insult." 

 "The herculean piper, six feet three inches in height, deliberately unbuckled his instrument and put it away carefully after detaching the bellows. With the latter as a weapon in his muscular grip he sailed into the crowd and put them to rout, fleeing in all directions for their lives." 

He returned to Ireland, settling in Swinford, County Mayo, where he taught the pipes to many pupils. O'Neill says that "His method of dismissing his pupils was as unceremonious as his own departure from England. When one had mastered a tune Walsh took the pupil’s hat and hung it outdoors as a signal for the owner to follow it. Without any unnecessary words another aspirant for musical learning was taken in hand and treated similarly." Among his acquaintances were James O'Brien and Piper Cribben.

References

 Famous performers on the Irish or Union pipes in the 18th and early part of the 19th centuries, Chapter XIX, Irish Minstrels and Musicians, Capt. Francis O'Neill, Chicago, Regan Printing House, 1913.

External links
 http://billhaneman.ie/IMM/IMM-XIX.html

19th-century Irish people
Irish uilleann pipers
Musicians from County Mayo